Johor Bahru Sentral (also known as JB Sentral) is an integrated transport hub in Bukit Chagar, Johor Bahru, Johor, Malaysia.

Inaugurated on 21 October 2010, it replaced the closed Johor Bahru railway station located 200m south of it. As part of the Southern Integrated Gateway, it is connected to the Sultan Iskandar Customs, Immigration and Quarantine Complex.

KTM Intercity via Shuttle Tebrau also served the Woodlands Train Checkpoint in Singapore across the Johor–Singapore Causeway. The station did not provide any train services from January to June 2022 due to the Gemas-Johor Bahru double-tracking project and services resumed in July 2022 after the new tracks between Johor Bahru and Kempas Baru were ready.

Johor Bahru Sentral serves as the Malaysian immigration checkpoint for southbound rail passengers towards Woodlands. Northbound rail passengers from Woodlands are processed by Malaysian immigration and customs officers at Woodlands Train Checkpoint prior to boarding.

Johor Bahru Sentral is planned to be the main hub for rail and bus transportation in Johor Bahru. It is proposed to be the main station of KTM ETS, KTM Komuter South, Transit Bus Terminal and will be connected to the future Bukit Chagar RTS and JB Sentral BRT stations.

Location 
Johor Bahru Sentral station is located in the central area of Johor Bahru around Bukit Chagar. Being part of Southern Integrated Gateway, the connection between the CIQ complex and the station is just via the connecting walkway over Jalan Jim Quee to the east and is very near to Johor Causeway where the only train connection to Singapore lies straight to Woodlands Train Checkpoint. It is also connected to City Square shopping complex via walkway over Jalan Tun Razak in the east. Both roads also provide road connections to the station, with Jalan Jim Quee also provide road access for motorcars from/to Singapore as it directly connected to the CIQ complex.

History

Johore Wooden Railway 
It was said that the history of Johor railway developments started in the 1869 where Sultan Abu Bakar (then still Maharaja) officiated construction of Johore Railway, which line are planned to be built northwards towards Gunung Pulai, 18 miles from the terminus here. While the line was indeed built from Johor Bahru and it has been operating in 1875 for the first 6 miles of construction, it was not clear for what function it serves and if Johor Bahru has a proper station standing here until 1889 where the railway is reported defunct.

Old FMSR era station 

The old station of Johor Bahru under Johore State Railway was opened in 1909 in conjunction of completion of the final West Coast main link sector from Gemas to Johor Bahru after a 5 year construction starting in 1904. As there was no land access to Singapore yet at that time, Johor Bahru used to be the southernmost terminus for Federated Malay State Railways trains in Malay Peninsular states. However FMSR has been running a combined trains and ferry services between both peninsular railway networks and Singapore Government Railways network. Both Johore Government Railways and Singapore Government Railways has been integrated under FMSR administration on 1912.

The station is able to serve services from linked FMSR railways of Malaya especially from West Coast states up to Penang and Pahang to the east from the start, and as FMSR network gradually spread, it later able to serve trains to Kedah, Perlis and Kelantan as well. It later able to serve trains up to Bangkok when FMSR connects to State Railways of Thailand network via Padang Besar in 1918 and as East Coast sector of Gua Musang completes construction in 1931, the East Coast line has been connected to SRT via Sungai Golok as well.

After Johore Causeway completed in 1923, trains has been able to serve southward to Tank Road in Singapore. The trains would later terminate at Tanjong Pagar station in Keppel Road after its opening in 1932. However Johor Bahru has since become one of the main stations of the rail network serving express and mail trains of the railway services especially between the town and Singapore. 

Johor Bahru station again becoming the terminus for the networks as Japanese Occupation strikes in 1942 forced British to blow up the Causeway in order to slow down Imperial Japanese Army entry to Singapore, severing the only train connection to Singapore. The connection was restored in 1946 after British control was reinstated in both states. In 1948, Johor Bahru station is now under Malayan Railways and later after independence, the current Keretapi Tanah Melayu.

As politics changed the state of the regions which ultimately made Singapore and Malaya, later Malaysia, two different countries, Johor Bahru station now lies on the international border between the two countries. However local and express trains remains running uninterrupted between the two countries with Johor Bahru station remains an important stop for the trains. For a while in the 1980s, it also serve Railbus service between Kulai and Singapore. 

Different from road entries on the causeway, Johor Bahru station which facilitate railway entries between the two countries did not really have any immigration and custom clearance facilities for some decades after first border control between the countries in 1967, as the matters is settled in Tanjong Pagar station instead. But as 1990 Point of Agreement between Malaysia and Singapore are signed and later on the whole disputes about the agreement rose, it forced Johor Bahru station to provide an immigration and customs clearance service for Singapore-bound trains while Malaysia clearance decided to stay in Tanjong Pagar for northbound trains. This practice remains until today, with changes being now Johor Bahru Sentral replaces the Singapore-bound part and Woodlands train checkpoint replaces the Malaysia-bound part after Tanjong Pagar station closes.

This station closes on 21 October 2010 as Johor Bahru Sentral replaces its purpose, with plans is to convert it as a railway museum.

Johor Bahru Sentral 
Johor Bahru Sentral is one of the proposed facilities of Malaysia's Southern Integrated Gateway which aims to provide an integrated entry hub for vehicles from Singapore to enter Malaysia via Johor Bahru, with others being a new Customs, Immigration and Quarantine complex and also a new bridge that aims to replace the Causeway. While the bridge plans is cancelled indefinitely, the new CIQ opens in 2008 for vehicular access. The whole project costed RM2.5 billion.

Johor Bahru Sentral was later opened for train services replacing the old station in 21 October 2010 with Sultan Ibrahim Ismail officiated the opening ceremony, and has since taken over the role as the main station for Johor Bahru city with now express and local services made their stop here instead. The clearance for Singapore-bound train services is also transferred here.

Although major Intercity trains did made their stop here in its early years of opening, the station later saw sharp decrease in passengers as the express services are reduced and later terminated in 2016 for many major West Coast services. Only three trips of Ekspres Selatan up to Pulau Sebang/Tampin and Gemas (with the current schedule only listed Gemas as the northernmost terminus) and a trip of Ekspres Rakyat Timuran to Tumpat, Kelantan is being served by this station. However, cross-border service between Johor Bahru Sentral and Woodlands Train Checkpoint remains despite the service is now limited to both checkpoints.

The COVID-19 pandemic also affects this station services as those above trains are either reduced in frequency or suspended, until restored gradually in 2022. Between January and June 2022 however this station has not been operated as trains are halted in Kempas Baru, in order to give way for Gemas-Johor Bahru Electrification and Double Tracking project between the stations. The station was back on operation in mid-June 2022 with recontinuation of Shuttle Tebrau, and both Ekspres Selatan and Ekspres Rakyat Timuran follows in July.

Gemas - Johor Bahru EDTP has been ongoing to be able to reconnect the station to electrified train network in the West Coast, and is expected to be fully operating in 2025. Once operating, ETS will be able to serve this stations, allowing for faster travel to Kuala Lumpur and northward. The station building has been built with this plan in mind, hence no major makeover is necessary as compared to other stations.

Around the station
 Johor Bahru City Square
 KTM Museum
 Komtar JBCC
 Persada Johor International Convention Centre
 Sultan Iskandar Building

See also
 Kuala Lumpur Sentral station

References

External links
 KTM Intercity train schedule and fares from and to Johor Bahru Sentral railway station

KTM ETS railway stations
Railway stations opened in 2010
Southern Integrated Gateway
Malaysia–Singapore border crossings